Diogo Campos Gomes (born 31 December 1990) is a Brazilian professional footballer who plays as a attacking midfielder.

Career

Diogo Campos, revealed by Atletico in 2010, still plays for the club that formed professional football.

On 31 January 2013, he signed at Thonon Evian as a loan deal. He will wear a shirt with "Diogo Gomes" on his back, although his nickname is "Diogo Campos".

Botev Plovdiv

On 8 January 2018 Diogo Campos signed a contract with Botev Plovdiv. He made an unofficial debut on 19 January and scored twice in a friendly game against Maritsa Plovdiv.

Diogo scored his first goal in an official game for Botev Plovdiv on 27 February during the 1-3 home defeat from Ludogorets Razgrad.

On 12 March, on day when Botev Plovdiv celebrated 106 years from its foundation, Diogo scored a goal for the dramatic 2-4 away win over Vereya.

On 21 April Diogo Campos scored a goal during the 2-4 defeat from Ludogorets Razgrad.

Honours

Club 
Persebaya Surabaya
 Liga 1 runner-up: 2019

Kalteng Putra
 Piala Presiden Semifinalist: 2019

References

External links
zerozerofootball.com

1990 births
Living people
Brazilian footballers
Atlético Clube Goianiense players
Thonon Evian Grand Genève F.C. players
Botafogo Futebol Clube (SP) players
Santa Cruz Futebol Clube players
Esporte Clube Água Santa players
Botev Plovdiv players
Kalteng Putra F.C. players
Persebaya Surabaya players
Borneo F.C. players
Negeri Sembilan FA players
Campeonato Brasileiro Série A players
Campeonato Brasileiro Série B players
Campeonato Brasileiro Série C players
Campeonato Brasileiro Série D players
Ligue 1 players
First Professional Football League (Bulgaria) players
Liga 1 (Indonesia) players
Malaysia Premier League players
Brazilian expatriate sportspeople in France
Expatriate footballers in France
Brazilian expatriate sportspeople in Bulgaria
Expatriate footballers in Bulgaria
Brazilian expatriate sportspeople in Indonesia
Expatriate footballers in Indonesia
Brazilian expatriate sportspeople in Malaysia
Expatriate footballers in Malaysia
Association football forwards
People from Tocantins
Sportspeople from Tocantins